Brunei participated in the 2010 Summer Youth Olympics in Singapore.

The Brunei squad consisted of 3 athletes competing in 2 sports: aquatics (swimming) and athletics.

Swimming

Athletics

Note: The athletes who do not have a "Q" next to their Qualification Rank advance to a non-medal ranking final.

Girls
Track and road events

References

External links
Competitors List: Brunei

Nations at the 2010 Summer Youth Olympics
You
Brunei at the Youth Olympics